Hoovinakere is a village in Kundapura taluka of Udupi district. It is the birthplace of Vadiraja swamiji of Dwaita philosophy. The village is located near to Kumbashi or Anneudde.

References 
Hoovinakere

Villages in Udupi district